Clazuril is a drug used in veterinary medicine as a coccidiostat.

See also
 Diclazuril
 Ponazuril
 Toltrazuril

References

Veterinary drugs
Antiprotozoal agents
Chloroarenes